Almeda is a railway station on the Llobregat–Anoia Line. It is located underneath Passeig dels Ferrocarrils Catalans, between Carrer de Dolors Almeda Roig and Carrer del Vallès, in the Cornellà de Llobregat municipality, to the south-west of Barcelona, in Catalonia, Spain. It is served by Barcelona Metro line 8, Baix Llobregat Metro lines S33, S4 and S8, and commuter rail lines R5, R6, R50 and R60.

Before then, the station was at-grade. It has two side platforms and two entrances from street level. The eastern exit leads to the east of Carrer de Sant Ferran and starts from the eastern ends of the platforms (towards Cornellà Riera); the western exit starts from the middle of the platforms and leads to the west of Carrer de Sant Ferran. The western exit was opened in 2006.

External links
 
 Information and photos of the station at trenscat.cat 
 Video on train operations at the station on YouTube

Barcelona Metro line 8 stations
Stations on the Llobregat–Anoia Line
Transport in Cornellà de Llobregat
Railway stations in Baix Llobregat
Railway stations located underground in Spain
Railway stations in Spain opened in 1985